David Lauren (born October 31, 1971) is an American businessman. He is the middle child and youngest son of clothing designer Ralph Lauren and husband of Lauren Bush.

Early life

David Lauren was born on October 31, 1971, to Ricky Ann (née Loew-Beer) and fashion designer and businessman Ralph Lauren. His father is the son of Belarus-born Jewish immigrants. His mother is the daughter of a Jewish father and a Catholic mother, both immigrants from Austria. The second of three children, Lauren has an older brother, Andrew Lauren, and a younger sister, Dylan Lauren.

Lauren attended Duke University, where he studied political science. At Duke, he founded Swing, a general interest lifestyle publication for Generation X, where he served as president and editor-in-chief. Swing was eventually published by Hachette Filipacchi Médias.

Career
Lauren is currently the Chief Innovation Officer, Strategic Advisor to the CEO, Head of the Ralph Lauren Foundation and Vice Chairman of the Board. Lauren previously held the position of Executive Vice President, Global Advertising, Marketing and Communications at Ralph Lauren Corporation where he was responsible for the global advertising and marketing campaigns for the company and all of its brands, as well as the company's corporate and fashion communications and strategic marketing partnerships.

Lauren joined Ralph Lauren Corporation in 2000 to run the company's internet operations with Ralph Lauren Media, LLC., where he launched the Ralph Lauren website under an idea he called "merchan-tainment", or the combination of merchandising and entertainment.

In his time at Ralph Lauren Corporation, Lauren has played a role in many key initiatives, including the establishment of RalphLauren.com, the launch of the Rugby brand, and Ralph Lauren Corporation's entry into mobile applications. Lauren has also orchestrated the company's sponsorship of several international sporting events and teams, including Wimbledon, the U.S. Open, and the U.S. Olympic teams. In 2007, he was named Daily News Record "Marketer of the Year".

Lauren joined the Board of Directors of Ralph Lauren Corporation in August 2013.

Personal life

Lauren serves as president of the Polo Ralph Lauren Foundation, with which he participates in numerous charitable organizations, including the Pink Pony fund, the Ralph Lauren Center for Cancer Care and Prevention, the Polo Jeans G.I.V.E. program, and the Star-Spangled Banner Preservation Project at the Smithsonian National Museum of American History.

On September 4, 2011, Lauren married Lauren Bush, a granddaughter of former U.S. President George H. W. Bush, in Colorado. Their son James Richard Lauren was born November 21, 2015.
Their second son, Max Walker Lauren, was born in 2018. Their third son, Robert Rocky Lauren, was born on April 10, 2021.

References

1971 births
American people of Belarusian-Jewish descent
American people of Austrian-Jewish descent
American people of Austrian descent
Duke University Trinity College of Arts and Sciences alumni
Living people
American fashion businesspeople
Businesspeople from New York City
Bush family
Lauren family